Cap Ecology (CE) is a French political party created on 27 February  2021, resulting from the merger of Cap21 and the Independent Ecological Alliance (AEI).

History 
On March 14, 2012, Jean-Marc Governatori launched a public partnership offer to Corinne Lepage so that a representative of independent ecology would be present in the first round of the presidential election. The candidate for the Independent Ecological Alliance offers the former minister reciprocal support and sponsorship for whoever has the most signatures today. Jean-Marc Governatori laid down as a prerequisite a programmatic agreement, and the lasting affirmation of independent ecology in France in the perspective of the 2012 legislative election and the 2014 municipal elections.

On February 27, 2021, Cap21 and the Independent Ecologist Alliance merged to found Cap Ecology. The following July 7, Cap21, whose administrative merger with the AEI has not yet registered for the primary, is excluded from the Ecologist Pole, due to a disagreement on secularism and the Republic between Corinne Lepage, former minister of Jacques Chirac, and Europe Ecology – The Greens; the Independent Environmental Alliance remains a member of the coalition.

Political position 
The party says it seeks "to promote a popular, republican and responsible ecology".

Leadership

Political office 
In 2021, the party's political bureau is composed as follows:

 Co-presidents: Corinne Lepage and Jean-Marc Governatori;
 General Secretaries: François Damerval and Patrice Miran;
 Members: Béatrice Hovnanian, Rachid Mokran, Chantal Cutajar, Stéphane Gemmani, Fazia Hamiche, Charles Girardin, Caroline Regin, Ghislain Wisocinski, Salima Yenbou, Franck Poirier, Sophie Spennato, Jean Rapenne, Fanny Puppinck and Noël Dedji.

Regional delegates 
Cap Ecology has the following regional delegates:

 Grand Est: Chantal Cutajar and Ghislain Wyzocinski
 Nouvelle-Aquitaine: Didier Cugy and Camille Lavoux
 Bourgogne-Franche-Comté: Jean Rapenne and Fabien Robert
 Brittany: Franck Poirier et Fabrice Le Calvez
 Centre-Val de Loire: Charles Girardin, Nicole Combredet
 Île-de-France: François Damerval, Rachid Mokran and Fetta Mellas
 Normandy: Béatrice Hovnanian, Jonas Massieu and Florence Filuzeau
 Occitanie: Stéphan Arnassant and Vincent Rivet-Martel
 Hauts-de-France: Alexandre Garcin and Philippe Normand
 Pays de la Loire: Grégoire Jauneault and Gauthier Dupont
 Provence-Alpes-Côte d'Azur: Jean-Marc Governatori
 Auvergne-Rhône-Alpes: Stéphane Gemmani and Sophie Spennato
 Corsica: Jean-François Baccarelli
 Overseas France: Maylis Lapouble

Elected members 
Caroline Roose and Salima Yenbou from the AEI were elected as MEPs in the 2019 election on the list led by Yannick Jadot (EELV). They sit in the group of the Greens/EFA. Roose left Cap Écologie in May 2021, criticizing the party's decision to present an electoral list competing with other environmental groups in the 2021 regional elections in Provence-Alpes-Côte d'Azur.

References

External links 

 

Political parties established in 2021
Green political parties in France